The Aldimi motorcycle was manufactured in Belgium between 1953 and 1956, and was a scooter powered by a 200cc Salolera engine. The company later imported Piatti scooters.

References

Motorcycles of Belgium